James Bailey (born 22 October 1969, in Melbourne) is an Australian professional darts player who plays in the Professional Darts Corporation events.

Career

In 2018, he won back-to-back events on the DPA Tour in St Clair, defeating Steve MacArthur in both finals.

Bailey qualified for the 2018 Melbourne Darts Masters, where he would lose 6–2 to Gary Anderson.

Later in the year, he won the Oceanic Masters final against Tim Pusey to qualify for the 2019 PDC World Darts Championship.

In his First Round match against Steve Lennon from Ireland he won four legs before losing 3–0.

World Championship results

PDC
2019: First round (lost to Steve Lennon 0–3)
2021: First round (lost to Callan Rydz 1–3)

References

External links

1969 births
Living people
Australian darts players
Professional Darts Corporation associate players
Sportspeople from Melbourne